The Principal Storekeeper of the Ordnance was a subordinate of the Master-General of the Ordnance and a member of the English (and later British) Board of Ordnance from its constitution in 1597. He was responsible for the care and maintenance of ordnance stores. The office was abolished in 1855.

Storekeepers of the Ordnance (pre-Restoration)
bef. 1558: John Leame
12 February 1558: William Watson
3 February 1574: Richard Bowland
16 January 1589: Thomas Bedwell
15 November 1595: John Lee
22 December 1603: Sir Amyas Preston
16 July 1609: Sir Roger Ayscough
1 June 1612: Samuel Hales and John Hamond (joint)
2 June 1614: Nedtracey Smart and Shakerley Tracy (d. bef. 1620) (joint)
26 November 1620: Thomas Powell and John Gooding (joint)
19 June 1627: Thomas Powell (d. 1635) and Richard Marsh (joint)
2 January 1643: Richard Marsh and Thomas Withins (d. bef. 1649) (joint)

Storekeepers of the Ordnance (Parliamentary)
1643: John Falkener

Storekeepers of the Ordnance (post-Restoration)
1660 Richard Marsh (restored)
17 March 1672 George Marsh
1 December 1673 Edward Conyers
1 August 1683: William Bridges
2 April 1685: Thomas Gardiner
27 March 1691: William Meesters
15 February 1701: James Lowther
27 September 1708: Robert Lowther
26 April 1710: Edward Ashe
28 June 1712: Dixie Windsor
8 March 1717: Sir Thomas Wheate, 1st Baronet
9 March 1722: George Gregory
23 April 1746: Andrew Wilkinson
31 December 1762: Sir Edward Winnington, 1st Baronet
12 September 1765: Andrew Wilkinson
20 June 1778: Benjamin Langlois
16 October 1780: Henry Strachey
13 May 1782: John Clater Aldridge
18 April 1783: Henry Strachey
1 March 1784: John Clater Aldridge
1 July 1795: Mark Singleton
22 February 1806: John McMahon
7 April 1807: Mark Singleton
8 July 1829: Frederick Trench
13 January 1831: Hon. Henry Duncan
30 December 1834: Francis Robert Bonham
1 May 1835: George Anson
28 June 1841: James Hanway Plumridge
13 September 1841: Francis Robert Bonham
4 August 1845: Sir Thomas Hastings

References

Senior appointments of the British Army